The Town of Cottesloe in Perth, Western Australia was originally established on 4 October 1895 as a road board with a chairman and councillors under the District Roads Act 1871. On 20 September 1907, it was proclaimed a municipality, with a mayor and councillors, under the Municipal Corporations Act 1906. With the passage of the Local Government Act 1960, all municipalities became Towns effective 1 July 1961.

Cottesloe Road District

Municipality of Cottesloe

Town of Cottesloe

References
 
 

Lists of local government leaders in Western Australia
Town of Cottesloe